Richard Christian Matheson (born October 14, 1953) is an American writer of horror fiction and screenplays, the son of fiction writer and screenwriter Richard Matheson. He is the author of over 100 short stories of psychological horror and magic realism which are gathered in over 150 major anthologies and in his critically hailed hardcover short story collections Scars and Other Distinguishing Marks, Amazon #1 bestseller Dystopia and Zoopraxis. He is the author of the suspense novel Created By and Hollywood novella of magic realism The Ritual of Illusion, and was the editor of the commemorative book Stephen King's Battleground. Matheson also adapted the short story which was made into an iconic episode of the TNT series Nightmares & Dreamscapes: From the Stories of Stephen King and won two Emmys.

He wrote or co-wrote the screenplays for Three O'Clock High, Full Eclipse, It Takes Two, Loose Cannons Shifter, Midvale The Nature of Evil (co-written with his father Richard Matheson), Paradise, It Waits, Happy Face Killer, Voices of Midway, "≤Red Sleep", "Hooky",  Dean Koontz's Soul Survivor as a 4-hour mini series, three Masters of Horror episodes, Stephen King's Big Driver, and Nightmare Cinema. He wrote for the magazines Amazing Stories and Tales From The Crypt among the others, and he is the author of the miniseries Nightmares & Dreamscapes and adapted as four-hour miniseries H. G. Wells' The Time Machine, Roger Zelazny's The Chronicles of Amber and Whitley Strieber's Majestic. Matheson also wrote comedy and drama pilots for major studios and networks. He co-created, co-executive produced and co-wrote all thirteen episodes of the Cinemax series Chemistry. He has been executive story consultant, supervising producer and executive producer for network television series. He is also the co-executive producer of the films Cub, It Waits, Paradise, Full Eclipse and Big Driver.

Selected filmography
 Three's Company (1978) (TV)
 The Incredible Hulk (1978–79) (TV)
 The Misadventures of Sheriff Lobo (1979) (TV)
 Stone (1980) (TV)
 Enos (1980) (TV)
 B.J. and the Bear (1981) (TV)
 The Powers of Matthew Star (1982) (TV)
 Knight Rider (1982) (TV)
 The A-Team (1983–86) (TV)
 Hardcastle and McCormick (1984–85) (TV)
 Stingray (1985) (TV)
 Stir Crazy (1986) (TV)
 Hunter (1985) (TV)
 Amazing Stories (1986–87) (TV)
 Three O'Clock High (with Thomas E. Szollosi) (1987)
 It Takes Two (with Thomas E. Szollosi) (1988)
 Loose Cannons (with Richard Matheson and Bob Clark) (1990)
 Tales from the Crypt (1991) (TV)
 The Torkelsons (1992) (TV)
 Arousal (film) 1996 (writer and director)
 Full Eclipse (with Michael Reaves) (1993) (TV)
 Sole Survivor (2000)
 Paradise (co-writer/creator/executive producer w/ Norman Steinberg) (2004) (TV)
 It Waits (2005)
 Masters of Horror (2005–06) (TV)
 Nightmares & Dreamscapes: From the Stories of Stephen King (2006) (TV)
 Shockers (TV Pilot and four episodes) (creator/writer/director) 2013
 Chemistry (co-writer/creator/executive producer with Norman Steinberg) (2011) (TV)
 Happy Face Killer (2014) (TV) 
 Voices of Midway (2014)
 Big Driver (2014) (writer/co-executive producer)
 Cub (2014) (co-executive producer)
 Nightmare Cinema (feature film) 2018 (screenwriter)
 Skin Trade (feature film) (2018)(screenwriter/producer)

See also
 List of horror fiction authors
 Splatterpunk

References

External links
 richardchristianmatheson.com
 rcmatheson.com
 
 

1953 births
Living people
20th-century American screenwriters
21st-century American screenwriters
20th-century American short story writers
20th-century American novelists
American horror writers
American television writers
Splatterpunk
Richard Matheson
Place of birth missing (living people)
American people of Norwegian descent
21st-century American male writers